Enzo Golino (18 March 1932 – 18 September 2020) was an Italian journalist, literary critic, and the author of several books.

References

1932 births
2020 deaths
Journalists from Naples
Writers from Rome
Italian male journalists
Italian literary critics
20th-century Italian journalists
21st-century Italian journalists
20th-century Italian male writers